{{Infobox writer
| name = Gaito Gazdanov
| image = Gazdanov-192?.jpg
| image_size = 235px
| caption = 
| native_name = Гайто (Гео́ргий) Иванович Газданов
Гæздæнты Бæппийы фырт Гайто
| birth_name = Gaito [Georgii] Ivanovich GazdanovGæzdænty Bæppijy fyrt Gajto
| birth_date = 
| birth_place = Saint Petersburg, Russian Empire
| death_date = 
| death_place = Munich, BRD
| occupation = short story writer, novelist, Radio Free Europe/Radio Liberty editor
| citizenship = Russian Empire (1899–1917)France (1920–1971)
| notableworks = An Evening with Claire  The Specter of Alexander Wolf  Night Roads}}

He was of Ossetian descent; his father was from Ossetia, a North Caucasian country within the Russian Empire. Gazdanov's first stories were published in France in 1926 in Russian. His novels An Evening with Claire (1929) and The Spectre of Alexander Wolf (1948) became his most well-known works, mentioned by writers Maxim Gorky, Ivan Bunin and Vladislav Khodasevich. Gazdanov was a member of the French Resistance in occupied France. In 1953, he joined Radio Free Europe/Radio Liberty as an editor. Although he learned perfect French whilst living in France, Gazdanov continued writing stories in Russian.

 Biography 

Gaito Gazdanov was born in 1903 in Saint Petersburg but was brought up in Siberia and Ukraine, where his father worked as a forester. He took part in the Russian Civil War on the side of Wrangel's White Army. In 1920, he left Russia and settled in Paris, where he was employed in the Renault factories. His early short stories and novels dealt with this Russian experience. But by the mid 1930s, the years in Paris turned Gazdanov's themes toward life, Russian or French, in France. Later, he earned his living as a taxicab driver. Gazdanov can be regarded as a White émigré. He died in Munich in 1971.

Gazdanov's first novel — An Evening with Claire (1929) — won accolades from Maxim Gorky and Vladislav Khodasevich, who noted his indebtedness to Marcel Proust. In "Black Swans", a 1930 short story, the protagonist commits suicide because he has no chance of moving to Australia, which he imagines to be an idealised paradise of graceful black swans. On the strength of his first short stories, Gazdanov was described by critics as one of the most gifted writers to begin his career in emigration.

Gazdanov's mature work was produced after World War II. He tried to write in a new genre, metaphysical thrillers. His mastery of criminal plots and understanding of psychological detail are evident in his two most popular novels, The Spectre of Alexander Wolf and The Return of the Buddha, whose English translations appeared in 1950 and 1951. The writer "excels in creating characters and plots in which cynicism and despair remain in precarious yet convincing balance with a courageous acceptance of life and even a certain joie de vivre." 

In 1953, Gazdanov joined Radio Liberty, where he hosted a program about Russian literature (under the name of Georgi Cherkasov) until his death of lung cancer in 1971.

Gazdanov's works were never published in the Soviet Union. After several decades of oblivion, starting in the 1990s more than fifty editions of his works, including a three-volume collection (1998) followed by a five-volume collection (2009, ed. by T.N. Krasavchenko) were finally published in post-Soviet Russia. The Ossetian artistic community, led by Valery Gergiev, had a new tombstone placed at his grave in Sainte-Geneviève-des-Bois. The annual Gazdanov Readings are held to discuss his literary heritage.

 Selected works
 Novels 
 An Evening with Claire, 1929, Вечер у Клэр)
 The Flight, 1939, Полёт; first complete ed. 1992)
 Night Roads, 1939–40, Ночные дороги) 
 The Spectre of Alexander Wolf, 1947–48, Призрак Александра Вольфа)
 The Buddha's Return, 1949–50, Возвращение Будды)

 Short stories 
 "The Beggar"
 "Black Swans" (1930)
 "Deliverance" (1936)
 "The Mistake" (1938)
 "Ivanov's Letters" (1963)

 English translations 

 The Specter of Alexander Wolf, translated by Nicholas Wreden (New York: Dutton, 1950)
 Buddha's Return, translated by Nicholas Wreden (New York: Dutton, 1951)
 An Evening with Claire, translated by Jodi Daynard (Ann Arbor: Ardis, 1988)
 Night Roads: A Novel, translated by Justin Doherty (Evanston: Northwestern, 2009)
 The Spectre of Alexander Wolf, translated by Bryan Karetnyk (London: Pushkin, 2013)
 The Buddha's Return, translated by Bryan Karetnyk (London: Pushkin, 2014)
 The Flight, translated by Bryan Karetnyk (London: Pushkin, 2016)The Beggar and Other Stories, translated and introduced by Bryan Karetnyk (London: Pushkin, 2018)

References

Further reading

External links
Gazdanov's entry in the Literary Encyclopedia
The Spectre of Alexander Wolf by Gaito Gazdanov – review from The Guardian''

1903 births
1971 deaths
Writers from Saint Petersburg
People from Sankt-Peterburgsky Uyezd
Ossetian writers
Russian people of Ossetian descent
20th-century novelists
Russian male novelists
20th-century Russian short story writers
Russian male short story writers
20th-century Russian male writers
Ossetian people
Emigrants from the Russian Empire to France
Radio Free Europe/Radio Liberty people
White Russian emigrants to France
Deaths from lung cancer
Burials at Sainte-Geneviève-des-Bois Russian Cemetery